The Our Lady of the Congo Cathedral or simply Kinshasa Cathedral, is a religious building of the Catholic Church located in the Liberation Avenue (formerly also called November 24 Avenue) in the city of Kinshasa, the capital and largest city of the African country of the Democratic Republic of Congo.

The building was built in 1947 when the country was still under colonial rule of Belgium, who called the area "Belgian Congo". During the government of Mobutu the church it was also called "Cathedral of Our Lady of Lingwala" for the place where the temple is located, since both names coexist.

The temple follows the Roman or Latin rite and functions as the headquarters of the Metropolitan Archdiocese of Kinshasa (Archidioecesis Kinshasana) which was created in 1959 by the Bull "Cum parvulum" of the Pope John XXIII.

See also
Roman Catholicism in the Democratic Republic of the Congo

References

Roman Catholic cathedrals in the Democratic Republic of the Congo
Buildings and structures in Kinshasa
Roman Catholic churches completed in 1947
1947 establishments in the Belgian Congo
Lukunga District
20th-century Roman Catholic church buildings in the Democratic Republic of the Congo